Campylodiscus elegans is a species of diatoms in the family Surirellaceae.

References

External links
 
 Campylodiscus elegans at algaebase

Surirellales